Hurst is an extinct town in Texas County, in the U.S. state of Missouri.

A post office called Hurst was established in 1900, and remained in operation until 1919. The community has the name of the local Hurst family, proprietors of a local country store.

References

Ghost towns in Missouri
Former populated places in Texas County, Missouri